Locastra pachylepidalis is a species of snout moth in the genus Locastra. It was described by George Hampson in 1896 and is known from Bhutan.

References

Moths described in 1896
Epipaschiinae